Santa Catarina Minas is a municipality in the state of Oaxaca in south-western Mexico. The municipality covers an area of  km². 
It is part of the Ocotlán District in the south of the Valles Centrales Region

References

Municipalities of Oaxaca